Triallylamine is the organic compound with the formula N(CH2CH=CH2)3. It is a colorless liquid with an ammonia-like odor. It is multifunctional, featuring a tertiary amine and three alkene groups.   Triallylamine (and mono- and diallyl amines) is produced by the treating allyl chloride with ammonia. 

Allylamines have particularly weak α-CH bonds, being near 80 kcal/mol.

Related compounds
Allylamine
Diallylamine

References

Allylamines